In engineering, maintainability is the ease with which a product can be maintained to:
 correct defects or their cause,
 Repair or replace faulty or worn-out components without having to replace still working parts,
 prevent unexpected working conditions,
 maximize a product's useful life,
 maximize efficiency, reliability, and safety,
 meet new requirements,
 make future maintenance easier, or
 cope with a changing environment.

In some cases, maintainability involves a system of continuous improvement - learning from the past to improve the ability to maintain systems, or improve the reliability of systems based on maintenance experience.

In telecommunication and several other engineering fields, the term maintainability has the following meanings:

 A characteristic of design and installation, expressed as the probability that an item will be retained in or restored to a specified condition within a given period of time, when the maintenance is performed by prescribed procedures and resources.
 The ease with which maintenance of a functional unit can be performed by prescribed requirements.

Software engineering 
In software engineering, these activities are known as software maintenance (cf. ISO/IEC 9126). Closely related concepts in the software engineering domain are evolvability, modifiability, technical debt, and code smells.

The maintainability index is calculated with certain formulae from lines-of-code measures, McCabe measures and Halstead complexity measures.

The measurement and tracking of maintainability are intended to help reduce or reverse a system's tendency toward "code entropy" or degraded integrity, and to indicate when it becomes cheaper and/or less risky to rewrite the code than it is to change it.

See also
 List of system quality attributes
 Maintenance (technical)
 Supportability (disambiguation)
 Serviceability (disambiguation)
 Software sizing
 RAMS
 Throwaway society

References

Further reading

External links
 Calculation, Field testing and history of Maintainability Index (MI) (with references)
 Measurement of Maintainability Index (MI)
 

Telecommunications engineering
Design for X
Maintenance
Software quality